Beijiao is a town in the district of Shunde, in the prefecture-level city of Foshan, Guangdong, China. Per a 2020 publication by the government of Shunde District, Beijiao has a permanent population of about 420,000 people; Beijiao has a hukou population of 150,695 .

Administrative divisions 
The town is divided into 10 residential communities and 10 administrative villages.

Residential communities 

 Beijiao Residential Community
 Bijiang Residential Community
 Lintou Residential Community
 Guangjiao Residential Community
 Sanhongqi Residential Community
 Chayong Residential Community
 Biguiyuan Residential Community
 Shunjiang Residential Community
 Junlan Residential Community
 Shejicheng Residential Community

Administrative villages 

 Huanglong Village
 Shencun Village
 Shuikou Village
 Malong Village
 Shangliao Village
 Xijiao Village
 Gaocun Village
 Taocun Village
 Xihai Village
 Sangui Village

Economy 
As of 2019, Beijiao's GDP was ¥64.5 billion, and grew at 7.3% annual rate. The town exported ¥83 billion worth of goods. Beijiao's tax revenue in 2019 totaled ¥14.03 billion.

The headquarters of Midea Group and Country Garden are both located in Beijiao. DJI also has a presence in the city.

Near Beijiao, there is the static inverter plant of HVDC Tianshengqiao-I Dam.

Healthcare 
The town has a hospital.

Transportation

Road 
The  runs through Beijiao.

Rail 
The town has two stations on the Guangzhou–Zhuhai intercity railway: Beijiao Station and Bijiang Station. In the future, the town will also be connected to Guangzhou Metro Line 7, Foshan Metro Line 3, and the Guangzhou–Foshan circular intercity railway.

Port 
The town has a port, which processes about 330,000 containers annually.

References

Shunde District
Towns in Guangdong